Lucien Bouchard, the first leader of the Bloc Québécois, was elected by acclamation by the MPs who formed the Bloc in 1990. When the party held its first convention in April 1995, his leadership was ratified by the delegates.

1996 BQ leadership election

The Bloc Québécois leadership election in 1996 was an election to replace Lucien Bouchard after he left the Bloc Québécois to become Premier of Quebec. The vote was conducted among members of the party's directorate rather than by all members of the party. Michel Gauthier won the election and became Leader of the Official Opposition.

1997 BQ leadership election

The Bloc Québécois leadership election in 1997 was held to elect a replacement for Michel Gauthier. The leadership election was conducted by a one member, one vote (OMOV) process involving all party members. Voters were asked to list their first, second and third choices on the ballot. Gilles Duceppe won the leadership election.

2011 BQ leadership election

Gilles Duceppe resigned as party president and leader immediately after the 2011 federal election in which the Bloc lost 44 of its 47 seats, including Duceppe's. Daniel Paillé was declared the winner of the subsequent leadership election on December 11, 2011, defeating Maria Mourani on the second ballot with 61.28% of the vote. A third candidate, Jean-Francois Fortin, was defeated on the first ballot.

2014 BQ leadership election

In 2014, Mario Beaulieu defeated André Bellavance for the leadership, winning 53.5% of the vote compared to Bellavance's 46.5%.

2017 BQ leadership election

Following Gilles Duceppe's second resignation after the 2015 federal election, Rhéal Fortin was appointed interim leader.

Martine Ouellet, a member of the Quebec National Assembly and former Parti Québécois cabinet minister and leadership candidate was acclaimed BQ leader on March 18, 2017.

2019 BQ leadership election

Martine Ouellet resigned on June 11, 2018, after receiving 32% support from a leadership review. Mario Beaulieu was appointed interim leader. Yves-François Blanchet was declared leader in January 2019 after running unopposed for the leadership role.

See also
Leadership convention

References